The Cichlinae are a subfamily of  fishes in the cichlid family, native to South America.

This subfamily consists of approximately 117 described species as of July 2017. Some authors have suggested that the Cichlinae encompasses all of the Neotropical Cichlids and found the taxon to be monphyletic and to be divided into seven tribes: Astronotini, Chaetobranchini, Cichlasomatini, Cichlini, Geophagini, Heroini, and Retroculini. In this system the Geophaginae plus the Chaetobranchini were recovered as the sister taxon to the clade consisting of the Heroini plus the Cichlatsomatini, these latter two being referred to as the subfamily Cichlasomatinae in some classifications, while the monogeneric Astronotini was a sister taxon to these four, while the Cichlini and Retroculini made up a sister clade of the other five.

Tribes 
The following tribes make up the subfamily Cichlinae:

 Cichlini
 Retroculini
 Astronotini
 Chaetobranchini
 Geophagini
 Cichlasomatini
 Heroini

See also

References

 
Fish subfamilies
Cichlidae
Cichlid fish of South America